Xingguo Temple, more commonly known as Zhangbafo, is a Buddhist temple located in Hubin Town, Binzhou, Shandong, China.

History
Xingguo Temple was first built around 534, under the Eastern Jin dynasty (266–420). Over the course of 1,470 years, the temple was destroyed and rebuilt many times, due to wars and natural disasters. The temple was gradually fell into ruin in the late Qing dynasty (1644–1911).

In 1998, Ou Tongguo, the CEO of Shenzhen ITAT Group, appropriated a large sum of money for reconstructing the temple. Four Heavenly Kings Hall, Mahavira Hall, Hall of Zhangbafo, wing-rooms were added to the temple.

In the middle of 2004, Shi Changgu was proposed as the new abbot of the temple. He raised funds to establish the Dining Hall, Meditation Hall, Reception Hall and other halls.

Architecture

high Statue of Buddha

Sitting on the lotus throne peacefully, the plump Buddha wears a Kasaya. It was engraved patterns of various Hercules, Hill censer (Boshanlu), Garuda and 24 human figures.

References

Buddhist temples in Shandong
Buildings and structures in Binzhou
Tourist attractions in Binzhou
6th-century establishments in China
6th-century Buddhist temples
Religious buildings and structures completed in 1998